Alina Ivanivna Komashchuk (born 24 April 1993) is a Ukrainian sabre fencer. Competing in team events, she is the 2013 World champion and 2016 Olympic silver medalist.

Career
In April 2013, Komashchuk won the gold medal in the Women's Sabre at the 2013 Junior and Cadet World Championship, held in the Croatian town of Poreč. On August 12, 2013 she won the Gold medal (with Olha Kharlan, Halyna Pundyk and Olena Voronina) at the Women's team sabre at the 2013 World Fencing Championships in Budapest, Hungary.

During the 2012–13 season Komashchuk was ranked 4th in the World in the Women's Junior Individual Sabre classement by the Federation Internationale d'Escrime (FIE).

Personal life 
Komashchuk was born in Netishyn, Ukraine. As of 2013, was a student at the Kamyanets-Podilsky Ivan Ohienko National University.

References

External links
 
 
 
 
 
 

1993 births
Living people
Ukrainian female sabre fencers
People from Netishyn
Armed Forces sports society (Ukraine) athletes
Fencers at the 2010 Summer Youth Olympics
Fencers at the 2015 European Games
European Games medalists in fencing
Fencers at the 2016 Summer Olympics
Olympic fencers of Ukraine
European Games gold medalists for Ukraine
Medalists at the 2016 Summer Olympics
Olympic silver medalists for Ukraine
Olympic medalists in fencing
Universiade medalists in fencing
Universiade silver medalists for Ukraine
Medalists at the 2011 Summer Universiade
Laureates of the Prize of the Cabinet of Ministers of Ukraine for special achievements of youth in the development of Ukraine
Sportspeople from Khmelnytskyi Oblast
20th-century Ukrainian women
21st-century Ukrainian women